Greer may refer to:

People
 Greer (surname)
 Greer (given name)

Places

United States
 Greer, Arizona, an unincorporated community and census-designated place
 Greer, Idaho,  an unincorporated community
 Greer, Missouri,  an unincorporated community
 Greer, Ohio, an unincorporated community
 Greer, South Carolina, a city
 Greer, West Virginia, an unincorporated community
 Greer County, Texas
 Greer County, Oklahoma

Antarctica
 Greer Peak, Marie Byrd Land

Other uses
 Greer High School, Greer, South Carolina
 Greer School, a former school for disadvantaged children in Dutchess County, New York
 Greer Industries, a privately held producer of limestone, steel and other products based in Morgantown, West Virginia
 USS Greer (DD-145), an American destroyer commissioned in 1918
 Herschel Greer Stadium, a baseball stadium located in Nashville, Tennessee
 Greer Grant (or Tigra), fictional superheroine appearing in American Marvel Comics books
 Carl W. Greer, the first Doc (G.I. Joe), and Carla P. Greer, the second
 "Greer", a track on DC Talk's 1992 album Free at Last

See also
 Greer Depot, Greer, South Carolina, a former railroad depot on the National Register of Historic Places
 Greer Post Office, Greer, South Carolina, on the National Register of Historic Places
 Greer House, a historic home in Rocky Mount, Virginia, on the National Register of Historic Places
 Greer Spring, Missouri
 Grier